Taghring  is a village development committee in Lamjung District in the Gandaki Zone of northern-central Nepal. At the time of the 2011 Nepal census it had a population of 2,318, 1,113 of them being male and 1,205 being female, living in 521 individual households.

References

External links
UN map of the municipalities of Lamjung District

Populated places in Lamjung District